Agent was an American hardcore band from Long Island, New York.

History
Agent began in 2006, releasing their first EP titled I Wouldn't Trade That for Anything on Iron Pier Records. In 2008, Agent released their second EP titled Awake In Their World on Run For Cover Records. In 2011, Agent released a split with the band Polygon on Iron Pier.

Discography
EPs
I Wouldn't Trade That for Anything (2006, Iron Pier)
Awake In Their World (2009, Run For Cover)
Splits
Agent/Polygon (2011, Iron Pier)

References

Hardcore punk groups from New York (state)
Musical groups from Long Island
Musical groups established in 2006